Anca Ionela Mateescu (born in 1981) is a Mexican canoeist. She participated in the 2007 Pan American Games and earned a bronze medal for her country in the Women's K1 500m canoe sprint event.

References

1983 births
Canoeists at the 2007 Pan American Games
Mexican female canoeists
Mexican people of Romanian descent
Living people
Pan American Games bronze medalists for Mexico
Pan American Games medalists in canoeing
Medalists at the 2007 Pan American Games
20th-century Mexican women
21st-century Mexican women